The XXV Corps of the Ottoman Empire ( or Yirmi Beşinci Kolordu) was one of the corps of the Ottoman Army. It was formed in Constantinople, Dersaâdet (present day: Istanbul) after the Armistice of Mudros.

Formations

Order of Battle, November 1918 
In November 1918, the corps was structured as follows:

XXV Corps (Constantinople, Dersaâdet)
 None

Order of Battle, January 1919 

In January 1919, the corps was structured as follows:

XXV Corps (Constantinople, Dersaâdet)
1st Division (İzmit)
70th Infantry Regiment, 71st Infantry Regiment, 124th Infantry Regiment
10th Division (Constantinople, Dersaâdet)
30th Infantry Regiment, 31st Infantry Regiment, 32 Infantry Regiment

Sources 

Corps of the Ottoman Empire
Military units and formations of the Ottoman Empire in World War I